Repentigny is a provincial electoral district in the Lanaudière region of Quebec, Canada, that elects members to the National Assembly of Quebec.  It consists of the municipality of Saint-Sulpice and part of the city of Repentigny.

It was created for the 2012 election from part of the L'Assomption electoral district.

Members of the National Assembly

Election results

^ Change is from redistributed results. CAQ change is from ADQ.

References

External links
Information
 Elections Quebec

Election results
 Election results (National Assembly)
 Election results (QuébecPolitique)

Maps
 2011 map (PDF)
2001–2011 changes to L'Assomption (Flash)
 Electoral map of Lanaudière region
 Quebec electoral map, 2011 

Quebec provincial electoral districts
Repentigny, Quebec